The Stage Door Gallery is located at 301 Mason Avenue, Cape Charles, Virginia, United States.  The gallery contains rotating exhibits of works by local artists.  The gallery contains  of floor space.

History
In November 2007, the Stage Door Gallery moved from 10 Strawberry Street, Cape Charles to its current location.

See also
Historic Palace Theatre

Notes

Art museums and galleries in Virginia
Buildings and structures in Northampton County, Virginia
Tourist attractions in Northampton County, Virginia